The Johor Bahru Chinese Heritage Museum is a museum in Johor Bahru, Johor, Malaysia. The museum is about the history of Chinese community in Johor Bahru.

Architecture
The museum is housed in a four-story shop house building.

Exhibitions
Collections in the museum include documents, music instruments, old money, photos, porcelain etc. It showcases the early days of the Chinese settlement in Johor Bahru, their history, culture, traditions and occupations.

Opening time
The museum opens everyday except Mondays from 9.00 a.m. to 5.00 p.m. for MYR3.

See also
 List of museums in Malaysia

References

Buildings and structures in Johor Bahru
Museums in Johor